The Lordship of Bromfield and Yale was formed in 1282 by the merger of the medieval commotes of Marford, Wrexham and Yale. It was part of the Welsh Marches and was within the cantref of Maelor in the former Kingdom of Powys.

The marcher lordship was originally bestowed on the Earls of Surrey of the Warenne family. In 1347 it passed to the Earls of Arundel of the FitzAlan family, a branch of the House of Howard. In 1415 the male line went extinct and the lordship was divided between three and eventually just two branches of the female line of the Fitzalans.

From Elizabeth Fitzalan, Duchess of Norfolk, co-heiress, it passed into the hands of her grandson, Sir William Stanley, Lord Chamberlain of Henry Tudor, but after Stanley was charged for high treason, the lordship was forfeited to the Crown under the Principality of Wales.

In the records of 1630 and 1649, under Charles Stuart, Prince of Wales, we see the lordship of Bromfield and Yale containing 16 Manors and 63 townships, with John Egerton, 1st Earl of Bridgewater, recorded as Chief Steward. The lordship was previously in the possession of King Charles II and Queen Henrietta Maria de Bourbon, aunt of Louis XIV, and daughter of Marie de' Medici. 

During the reign of Charles I, the land mineral rights were sold, as the king was desperate for money after losing his parliament. The buyer was Sir Richard Grosvenor of Eaton Hall, ancestor of the Dukes of Westminster, and proprietor of the Grosvenor Estate.

The lordship followed the law of the March rather than the law of England or the law of Wales.

Notes

Bibliography
R. R. Davies. "The Law of the March". Welsh History Review = Cylchgrawn Hanes Cymru 5 (1970): 1–30.
Thomas Peter Ellis. The First Extent of Bromfield and Yale, A.D. 1315. London: Honourable Society of Cymmrodorion, 1924.
Derrick Pratt. "Anatomy of Conquest: Bromfield and Yale, 1277–84." Transactions of the Denbighshire Historical Society 56 (2008): 17–58.
Derrick Pratt. "Medieval Bromfield and Yale: The Machinery of Justice." Transactions of the Denbighshire Historical Society 53 (2004): 19–78.
Michael Rogers. The Welsh Marcher Lordship of Bromfield and Yale, 1282–1485. PhD diss. University of Wales, 1992.

1282 establishments in Wales
States and territories established in 1282
 
Henrietta Maria
Charles II of England